Matthew Neil Jones (born 11 October 1980 in Shrewsbury, England), is a footballer who played as a midfielder for Shrewsbury Town in The Football League.

He made his debut for the Shrews on 8 May 1999 in the Third Division 3–0 away win against Torquay United at Plainmoor. He came on as a second-half substitute for Austin Berkley.

References

External links

1980 births
Living people
Sportspeople from Shrewsbury
English footballers
Association football midfielders
Shrewsbury Town F.C. players
Southport F.C. players
English Football League players